Norma is a female name. It is of Germanic and Romance origin. 

A single instance of the name Norma is recorded 1203, where it perhaps derives from the Latin word norma, meaning "precept". The name's general usage seems to be subsequent to the 1831 debut of Vincenzo Bellini's opera Norma whose librettist Felice Romani borrowed the name (and the plot) from the recent tragedy Norma by Alexandre Soumet. Soumet's choice of name for his title character may possibly have been influenced by the name of the Germanic mythological Norns.

The name has fluctuated in popularity over the past 100 years.  It is still a very common name in the United States, but the name was most often given to babies in the 1930s, and is now seldom given. More recently Norma has been used as a female equivalent of the name Norman, meaning "Norseman".

Notable people named Norma
 Norma Alarcón (born 1943), Chicana author and publisher in the United States
 Norma Aleandro (born 1936), an Argentine actress
 Norma Alvares, Indian lawyer, social worker and environmental activist
 Norma Amezcua (born 1953) is a Mexica,n former butterfly, freestyle and medley swimmer
 Norma Andrade, founding member of Mexican non-profit association Nuestras Hijas de Regreso a Casa A.C. 
 Norma Andrews, cell biologist and professor
 Norma Argentina (born 1948), Argentine actress
 Norma Ashby (born 1935), television broadcaster
 Norma Cole (born 1945), a visual artist, translator and American poet
 Norma Egstrom, the birth name of Peggy Lee, an actress, singer and songwriter
 Norma Alicia Moreno Figueroa (1962–1986), Mexican journalist 
 Norma Foley (born 1970), Irish politician 
 Norma Angélica Ladrón de Guevara (1937–1962), Mexican actress
 Norma Huembes (born 1998), Nicaraguan model, public accountant, and beauty pageant titleholder
 Norma Khouri (born 1970), a Jordanian author
 Norma Klein (1938–1989), an American author
 Norma Kuhling (born 1990), an American actress
 Norma MacMillan (1921–2001), a Canadian voice actress
 Norma Major (born 1942), wife of British Prime Minister John Major
 Norma Abdala de Matarazzo (born 1948), Argentine politician
 Norma Fox Mazer (1931–2009), Jordanian author
 Norma McCorvey (born 1947), the "Jane Roe" in the "Roe v. Wade" abortion case
 Norma Jeane Mortenson (1926–1962, baptized Norma Jean Baker), the birth name of Marilyn Monroe, American actress and model
 Norma Nolan, a 1962 Miss Universe
 Norma Pujol (born 1988), Catalan politician
 Norma Shearer (1901–1983), a Canadian-American actress and Hollywood star from 1925 to 1942
 Norma Merrick Sklarek (1926–2012), African-American architect
 Norma Smallwood (1909–1966), a Miss America for 1926
 Norma Stitz, a website entrepreneur and nude model
 Norma Talmadge (1894– 1957), a Hollywood star of the silent era
 Norma Teagarden (1911–1996), American jazz pianist
 Norma Waterson (1939–2022), English musician
 Norma Winstone (born 1941), a British jazz singer and musician
 Siti Norma Yaakob (born 1940), Malaysian lawyer and judge
 Norma Azucena Rodríguez Zamora, Mexican politician affiliated with the Party of the Democratic Revolution.
 Norma Bell and Mary Bell, murderous duo from the UK ( not related even though they have the same surname )

Fictional characters
Grammy Norma is a character in the 2012 animated movie The Lorax. The voice over was done by Betty White.
Norma, a cow villager from the video game series Animal Crossing
Norma, a minor character from Square's console role-playing game Final Fantasy Mystic Quest
Norma Arnold, mother of Kevin Arnold in the 1988–1993 television series The Wonder Years
Norma Bates, a fictional character created by writer Robert Bloch
Norma Bates, a Passions character
Norma Cenva, a character from the three prequels to Frank Herbert's Dune novels
Norma Desmond, a character in the film Sunset Boulevard
Norma Manders, a character in the 1984 American science fiction horror movie Firestarter
Norma Romano, a recurring character in the TV series Orange Is the New Black
Norma Watson, a character in the novel Carrie by Stephen King and film Carrie (1976)
Norma Rae Webster, heroine of the film Norma Rae (1979)
Norma, a CPU seen in Mondstadt, Genshin Impact
Norma Khan, a character in Dead End: Paranormal Park

References

External links
 Norma at Behind the Name
 Secondary source for Norma

Feminine given names